Punta Laurel is a town and corregimiento in Bocas del Toro District, Bocas del Toro Province, Panama. Its population as of 1990 was 692; its population as of 2000 was 966.

References

Populated places in Bocas del Toro Province
Corregimientos of Bocas del Toro Province